Denis Belyanovich Gribanov (born 3 June 1986) is a Russian sailor. He and Pavel Sozykin placed 13th in the men's 470 event at the 2016 Summer Olympics.

References

External links
 
 
 

1986 births
Living people
Russian male sailors (sport)
Olympic sailors of Russia
Sailors at the 2016 Summer Olympics – 470
Universiade medalists in sailing
Universiade gold medalists for Russia
Medalists at the 2011 Summer Universiade
Sailors at the 2020 Summer Olympics – 470